The 2018–19 Czech First League, known as the Fortuna liga for sponsorship reasons, was the 26th season of the Czech Republic's top-tier football league. The defending champions were Viktoria Plzeň, who won their fifth Czech title the previous season. The season was the first with a new league structure in which 16 clubs play each other home and away, until the league is split up into championship, Europa League and relegation groups. Dukla Prague lost seven consecutive games at the start of the season, becoming the first team in the Czech First League to do so.

Teams

Team changes

Stadiums and locations

Regular season

League table

Results
Each team plays home-and-away against every other team in the league, for a total of 30 matches played each.

Championship group
Points and goals were carried over in full from the regular season.

Europa League play-offs
Teams placed between 7th and 10th position will take part in the Europa league play-offs. The best of them will play against the fifth-placed of the championship play-offs to determine the Europa League play-off winners. The winners will qualify for the second qualifying round of the 2019–20 UEFA Europa League.

Final

Relegation group
Points and goals were carried over in full from the regular season.

Relegation play-offs
Teams placed 14th and 15th in the relegation group will face 2nd and 3rd teams from Czech National Football League for two spots in the next season.

Match 1

MFK Karviná won 3–2 on aggregate and retained their spot in the 2019–20 Czech First League; Vysočina Jihlava remained in the 2019–20 Czech National Football League.

Match 2

1. FK Příbram won 3–3 on aggregate with away goals and retained their spot in the 2019–20 Czech First League; FC Zbrojovka Brno remained in the 2019–20 Czech National Football League.

Top scorers

Attendances

See also
 2018–19 Czech Cup
 2018–19 Czech National Football League

References

External links
  

2018–19 in European association football leagues
1
2018-19